Thyas juno is a species of moth of the family Erebidae first described by Johan Wilhelm Dalman in 1823. It is found in the Indian subregion, China, Japan, Korea, Thailand, Borneo, Java, Sulawesi and on the southern Moluccas.

The larvae feed on Castanea, Quercus, Juglans and Pterocarya species.

References

Ophiusina
Insects of Korea
Moths of Asia
Moths of Japan
Moths described in 1823